Moritschus is a genus of crabs in the family Pseudothelphusidae, containing the following species:
 Moritschus altaquerensis Rodríguez, Campos & López, 2002
 Moritschus caucasensis Campos, Malgahães & Rodríguez, 2002
 Moritschus ecuadorensis (Rathbun, 1897)
 Moritschus henrici (Nobili, 1897)
 Moritschus narinnensis Campos & Rodríguez, 1988

References

Pseudothelphusidae